Dark Deceiver is the fifth album by American Progressive metal band Zero Hour. It was released in 2008.

Track listing
 Power to Believe  – 7:07
 Dark Deceiver  – 3:56
 Inner Spirit  – 12:19
 Resurrection  - 3:18
 Tendonitis - 1:19
 The Temple Within - 6:13
 Lies  – 3:20
 The Passion Of Words  – 4:32
 Severed Angel (Instrumental) – 2:37

Credits
 Chris Salinas - vocals
 Jasun Tipton - guitars
 Troy Tipton - Bass
 Mike Guy - drums

2000 albums
Zero Hour (band) albums